Alexander Beckett (28 February 1879 – 1949) was a British diver. He competed in the men's 3 metre springboard event at the 1908 Summer Olympics.

References

1879 births
1949 deaths
British male divers
Olympic divers of Great Britain
Divers at the 1908 Summer Olympics
Sportspeople from London